Apilocrocis pimalis, the Pima apilocrocis moth, is a moth in the family Crambidae. It was described by William Barnes and Foster Hendrickson Benjamin in 1926. It is found in North America, where it has been recorded from Arizona and Texas.

The wingspan is 20–30 mm. Adults are on wing from June to August.

References

Moths described in 1926
Spilomelinae
Moths of North America